Nikoleta Pitsiou (born 4 September 2000) is a Greek footballer who plays as a midfielder for PAOK and the Greece national team.

International career
Pitsiou made her debut for the Greece national team on 27 October 2020, coming on as a substitute for Thenia Zerva against Ukraine.

Honours
PAOK
 A Division (5): 2016/17, 2017/18, 2018/19, 2019/20, 2020/21
 Greek Cup (1): 2016/17

References

2000 births
Living people
Women's association football midfielders
Greek women's footballers
Greece women's international footballers
PAOK FC (women) players